Rune Bech (born 26 June 1966, in Denmark) is a serial digital entrepreneur living between Britain and Denmark, and a former foreign correspondent, broadcast journalist and television executive. In 1998 he was one of the early internet pioneers in Europe when he co-founded the award-winning independent health information portal NetDoctor.com. Later, after six years as digital head for Denmark's national broadcaster TV 2, he co-founded the healthtech company Liva Healthcare working with NHS England in preventing diabetes and obesity. In 2010 he made headlines in the jazz world when re-opening Copenhagen's legendary jazz venue, Jazzhus Montmartre.

Career 

After an early career as a foreign correspondent for the Danish newspaper Politiken from 1989 until 1997 (Eastern Europe and London), and as a foreign affairs reporter with the national Danish broadcaster TV 2 in 1997–1998, he co-founded NetDoctor.com in 1998 and took it from a Danish start-up into a major digital publisher of health information in Britain, Germany, Scandinavia and several other European countries. Later, in 2001, he re-joined TV 2 as Chief Digital Officer for six years and in this position launched one of Europe's first TV and film on-demand services, TV 2 Sputnik, later renamed TV 2 Play.

After co-founding and selling two more healthtech companies E-Doktor (2002-2008) and SundhedsDoktor (2006-2016), he co-founded Liva Healthcare in 2015, specialised in digital health coaching and disease management, with offices in London and Copenhagen. NHS England selected Liva as a digital innovation partner in trying to prevent and reverse type 2 diabetes and obesity in 2017 (The "Healthier You" Digital Diabetes Prevention Programme, DDPP).

Passion 

As a passion project in 2010, Rune Bech initiated the re-opening of Copenhagen's legendary jazz venue, Jazzhus Montmartre. The place has a story going back to 1959 when it put Copenhagen on the world map of jazz by attracting some of the best artists of the time. Several famous jazz musicians fell in love with the place and relocated to Copenhagen in the 1960s and 1970s. Among them Dexter Gordon, Ben Webster, Stan Getz, Kenny Drew, and many more. Using Jazzhus Montmartre as their hub, they served as mentors for major Danish jazz artists such as Niels-Henning Ørsted Pedersen, Palle Mikkelborg, Bo Stief, Alex Riel and many more.

Private life 
Rune Bech is son of deputy headmaster Thomas Bech Pedersen (born 1920, deceased 2004) and pre-school teacher Anne Margrethe Nygaard Pedersen (born 1931, deceased 2004). He grew up as the youngest of four children at a hobby farm near the village of Køng on the Danish island of Funen. 
Rune Bech lives between London in the UK, and Copenhagen and Svendborg in Denmark. He has two sons Bjarke Bech (born 1993) og Mathæus Bech (born 1995) from his first marriage (1988-2015).
Rune Bech is a keen sailor, and a performing arts critic and writer.

References

External links 
 Kraks Blå Bog (Who is Who), Copenhagen
 Website

1966 births
Living people
20th-century Danish journalists
Danish foreign correspondents
Reporters and correspondents
Danish television journalists
Politiken people
People from London
People from Copenhagen
People from Svendborg
Danish expatriates in the United Kingdom
Chief digital officers